The Aschelminthes (also known as Aeschelminthes, Nemathelminthes, Nematodes), closely associated with the Platyhelminthes, are an obsolete phylum of pseudocoelomate and other similar animals that are no longer considered closely related and have been promoted to phyla in their own right. The term Aschelminth is now generally only used as an informal name for any member of the approximately ten different invertebrate phyla formerly included within Aschelminthes.

It is a polyphyletic group.

Subdivisions
Although invertebrate experts do not necessarily agree on these categorizations, groups that are generally incorporated into Aschelminthes include:

 Gastrotricha

Gnathifera
 Acanthocephala
 Chaetognatha
 Rotifera

Nematoidea
 Nematoda
 Nematomorpha

Scalidophora
 Kinorhyncha
 Loricifera
 Priapulida

In addition, Cycliophora, Entoprocta and Tardigrada are sometimes included.

References

External links
 Aschelminth information page (archived from the original on 2009-08-20)

Obsolete animal taxa